San Juan de Oriente is a municipality in the Masaya department of Nicaragua.

References

Populated places in Nicaragua
Municipalities of the Masaya Department
Populated places established in 1585